Lowell Mason Maxham (1841–1931) was a recipient of the Medal of Honor for heroism during the American Civil War.

Biography
Lowell Mason Maxham was born on December 6, 1841 in Carver, Massachusetts. During the Civil War, he joined the Union Army at Taunton, Massachusetts and was a corporal in Company F, of the 7th Regiment Massachusetts Volunteer Infantry.  He was awarded the Medal of Honor for heroism at the Second Battle of Fredericksburg on May 3, 1863 during VI Corps' seizure of Marye's Heights during the Chancellorsville Campaign.  Maxham carried the regiment's colors and despite severe wounds planted them in the rebels' works.

He is one of eight recipients of the Medal of Honor to be a member of the Ancient and Honorable Artillery Company of Massachusetts. On August 24, 1896, he received his Medal of Honor alongside his two regimental comrades, James Holehouse and James H. Luther.

He married Annette A. King of Raynham (1845-1899) on January 1, 1866.

After the war, he became an inventor, patenting designs for an automobile bumper and a third rail for trolley cars.

Maxham died on February 13, 1931.  He is buried in the Mayflower Hill Cemetery in Taunton.

Medal of Honor citation

Legacy
Lowell M. Maxham Elementary School in Taunton, Massachusetts is named after him.

References

External links
 

1841 births
1931 deaths
American Civil War recipients of the Medal of Honor
United States Army Medal of Honor recipients
Union Army soldiers
People of Massachusetts in the American Civil War
People from Carver, Massachusetts
People from Taunton, Massachusetts